Kalavasos is a village in the Larnaca District of Cyprus, located 6 km north of Zygi. In its vicinity, there are copper mines.

The name is reputed to mean beautiful (καλά) wooded valley (βάσσα) in old Greek.

History
Kalavasos has been a settlement since the New Stone Age. The Tenta archaeological site is located in Kalavasos.

Gallery

References

Communities in Larnaca District